Kami is a unisex given name that may refer to the following notable people:
Kami Asgar (born 1965), Iranian-American sound editor and film producer
Kami Cotler (born 1965), American actress and educator]
Kami Craig (born 1987), American water polo player
Kami Garcia (born 1972), American writer
Kami Hiraiwa (born 1979), Japanese actress
Kami Imai (born 1980), Japanese manga artist 
Kami Kabange (born 1984), Congolese-born Rwandan basketball player
Kami Lyle, American singer-songwriter
Kami Paul, Pakistani musician
 Kami Rita (born 1970), Nepali Sherpa mountaineer
Kami Sid, Pakistani transgender model